Gogogogo is a rural municipality in southwestern Madagascar. It belongs to the district of Ampanihy, which is a part of Atsimo-Andrefana. The population of the municipality was 19,454 in 2018.

Only primary schooling is available. About 60% of the population are farmers, while an additional 15% make their livelihood from raising livestock. The most important crop is cassava, while other important products are peanuts, maize, sweet potatoes and cowpeas. Services provide employment for 25% of the population.
There are also some mineral resources in the area.

References 

Populated places in Atsimo-Andrefana